West Homestead is a borough in Allegheny County, Pennsylvania, United States,  southeast of Pittsburgh, on the Monongahela River. Heavy industries associated with nearby steel mills existed here, such as axle works, brickworks, and manufactories of machinery, car wheels, etc. The largest concern was Mesta Machinery, which was one of the world's leading industrial manufacturers from 1898 until 1983.  The population was 1,872 at the 2020 census.

History 
There are two primary residential communities in West Homestead: the historic district and the Village, a post-World War II hilltop community. The historic district consists of a series of hillside residential streets adorned by intact worker houses reflecting the architecture of the late nineteenth and early twentieth century period when most of these homes were originally built. Composed of homes perfectly suited for contemporary restoration, this neighborhood has a commanding view of the gorgeous river valley.

One of the most noteworthy structures in the historic district is the great Mesta Mansion and accompanying gardens, which was originally built by steel manufacturer and engineer George Mesta, founder of the Mesta Machine Company. Upon his death in 1925 the mansion became the property of his widow, the celebrated socialite and political hostess Perle Mesta, and remained in the Mesta family until the 1970s. This marvelous structure is on the National Register of Historic Places and has undergone a luxurious  and ongoing restoration process in recent years.

Another feature of the historic district is the Bulgarian Macedonian National Educational and Cultural Center on West Eighth Avenue. Since 1935, this facility has continued to be the center of Bulgarian and Macedonian cultural activity in Western Pennsylvania. West Homestead's Eighth Avenue itself is a tree-lined boulevard adorned by Victorian shops on the National Register of Historic Places, and the neighborhood is surrounded by the largest group of ethnic churches on the National Register.

Geography
West Homestead is located at  (40.394369, −79.915224).

Surrounding and adjacent neighborhoods
North – Hazelwood (a Pittsburgh neighborhood) via Glenwood Bridge across the Monongahela River
North east – Homestead (an Allegheny county borough)
South east – Munhall (an Allegheny county borough)
South west – New Homestead (a Pittsburgh neighborhood)
West – Hays (a Pittsburgh neighborhood)

Attractions
In 2000, Continental Realestate Companies opened The Waterfront.  This large "LifeStyle" shopping center was built on the former site of the US Steel Works.  Most of the structures associated with the steel mills on this site were demolished during construction. Still standing in the Waterfront development are some of the brick stacks from the Homestead Steel Works. In addition, near the river is a former mill structure known as the Pump House which was restored by the developer.

Sandcastle Waterpark is a waterpark that has 14 water slides and 3 speed slides and the newest addition the Blue Tooba Looba.

There are two parks located in West Homestead: Calhoun Community Park (Located off of Fieldstone Drive) and Eighth Avenue Playground (Located next to West Homestead Volunteer Fire Department, entrance on Eighth Avenue).  For park rules and hours visit .

Government and politics

Demographics

As of the census of 2000, there were 2,197 people, 956 households, and 623 families residing in the borough. The population density was 2,408.9 people per square mile (932.2/km2). There were 1,106 housing units at an average density of 1,212.7 per square mile (469.3/km2). The racial makeup of the borough was 89.53% White, 8.83% African American, 0.18% Native American, 0.55% Asian, 0.05% from other races, and 0.86% from two or more races. Hispanic or Latino of any race were 0.55% of the population.

There were 956 households, out of which 22.9% had children under the age of 18 living with them, 47.3% were married couples living together, 12.9% had a female householder with no husband present, and 34.8% were non-families. 30.4% of all households were made up of individuals, and 13.2% had someone living alone who was 65 years of age or older. The average household size was 2.30 and the average family size was 2.87.

In the borough the population was spread out, with 21.0% under the age of 18, 5.1% from 18 to 24, 25.4% from 25 to 44, 24.9% from 45 to 64, and 23.6% who were 65 years of age or older. The median age was 44 years. For every 100 females, there were 88.6 males. For every 100 females age 18 and over, there were 89.2 males.

The median income for a household in the borough was $33,309, and the median income for a family was $44,338. Males had a median income of $35,033 versus $27,700 for females. The per capita income for the borough was $17,327. About 9.2% of families and 13.7% of the population were below the poverty line, including 20.6% of those under age 18 and 5.5% of those age 65 or over.

Notable person
Jeff Goldblum, actor.

See also
Homestead, Pennsylvania

References

External links

West Homestead borough government

Populated places established in 1900
Pittsburgh metropolitan area
Boroughs in Allegheny County, Pennsylvania
Pennsylvania populated places on the Monongahela River